"I'll Be Around" is a popular song written by Alec Wilder and published in 1942.  It was first recorded by Cab Calloway and his Orchestra in 1942 and the first hit version was by The Mills Brothers in 1943 when it reached No. 17 in the Billboard pop charts.  The song has become a well-known standard, recorded by many artists.

Background
Wilder said, in an interview with Jay Nordlinger, that the song came to him in a taxi cab in Baltimore.  Just the title. "I spotted [the title] as I was crumpling up the envelope some days later. Since I was near a piano, I wrote a tune, using the title as the first phrase of the melody. I remember it only took about 20 minutes. The lyric took much longer to write."

Recorded versions 

Mildred Bailey (1942)
Tony Bennett
Brook Benton (1960)
Eve Boswell (1951)
Ruby Braff
Les Brown and his Band of Renown (1959)
Cab Calloway and his orchestra (1942)
Diahann Carroll
Don Cherry (1956)
Rosemary Clooney (1951)
Randy Crawford (1995)
Vic Damone (1959)
Bobby Darin (1960)
Doris Day (1950)
Eileen Farrell
Tiziana Ghiglioni
Eydie Gorme (1966)
Al Hibbler (1958)
Billie Holiday Lady in Satin (1958)
Lena Horne (1944)
Engelbert Humperdinck (1985)
Frank Ifield - included in his album Blue Skies (1964)
Harry James and Helen Ward
Salena Jones (2002)
Chaka Khan with Miles Davis, CK (album) (1988) - Arranged by Dave Grusin.
Rebecca Kilgore (1994)
Cleo Laine and Dudley Moore (1982)
Peggy Lee (1962)
Gloria Lynne (1965)
Seth MacFarlane - (2019) Once in a While
Marian McPartland (1955) - Live at Maybeck Recital Hall (1991), Marian Mcpartland Plays the Music of Alec Wilder (1992)
Helen Merrill - Merrill at Midnight (1957)
Glenn Miller and the Army Air Force Band (1944)
Mitch Miller, Percy Faith Orchestra, and Chorus (1956)
The Mills Brothers (1943)
 Jane Monheit (2010)
Red Norvo and his orchestra (1943)
Jackie Paris
Tony Pastor and his orchestra
Arthur Prysock
Linda Purl (1998)
Johnnie Ray
George Shearing - The Definitive George Shearing (2002)
Don Shirley
Dinah Shore
Frank Sinatra - (1943) for Columbia Records, In the Wee Small Hours (1955)
Carly Simon (1981)
Carol Sloane (1996)
Johnny Smith - Moonlight In Vermont (1952)
Hank Thompson (1961)
The Three Sounds (1962)
Mel Tormé
Sarah Vaughan (1963)
Marlene Ver Planck (1986)
Dinah Washington (1962)
Jackie Wilson (1962)

References

External links 
SteynOnline

Songs written by Alec Wilder
1942 songs
Don Cherry songs
Mildred Bailey songs
Cab Calloway songs